Salmon Brook may refer to:

Salmon Brook, Connecticut, United States, a census-designated place in the town of Granby
Salmon Brook (Merrimack River), a stream in Massachusetts and New Hampshire in the United States

See also
Salmons Brook, a stream in the London Borough of Enfield, United Kingdom